Sitskoye is a rural locality (a selo) in Nikolotorzhskoye Rural Settlement, Kirillovsky District, Vologda Oblast, Russia. The population was 14 as of 2002.

Geography 
Sitskoye is located 36 km southeast of Kirillov (the district's administrative centre) by road. Zarechye is the nearest rural locality.

References 

Rural localities in Kirillovsky District